Terenodon is a genus of fungi in the family Gomphaceae. A monotypic genus, it contains the single species Terenodon serenus, described by Dutch mycologist Rudolph Arnold Maas Geesteranus in 1971.

References

Gomphaceae
Monotypic Basidiomycota genera